John Hobart, 2nd Earl of Buckinghamshire (17 August 17233 August 1793) was a British nobleman and politician.

Biography
The son of John Hobart, 1st Earl of Buckinghamshire by his first wife Judith Britiffe, he was educated at Westminster School and Christ's College, Cambridge. He was Member of Parliament for Norwich from 1747 to 1756, having also been elected for St Ives in 1747 but opting to sit for Norwich. He held office as Comptroller of the Household in 1755-56 and as a Lord of the Bedchamber from 1756 to 1767, having succeeded his father as Earl in 1756. He was Ambassador from the United Kingdom to Russia from 1762 to 1765 and Lord Lieutenant of Ireland from 1776 to 1780, when his Chief Secretary was Sir Richard Heron, Bt. In the latter role, he had to concede free trade and, more importantly, the enactment of the Papists Act 1778 which partially repealed the Penal laws and provided measures for the relief of Roman Catholics and Dissenters.

Family

He married firstly Mary Anne Drury, daughter of Sir Thomas Drury, 1st Baronet, and secondly, Caroline, daughter of William James Conolly, but died without surviving male issue and was succeeded by his half-brother George Hobart, 3rd Earl of Buckinghamshire.

He had three daughters by his first wife:
Lady Harriet, Marchioness of Lothian (1762–1805), who married William Kerr, 6th Marquess of Lothian, and was the mother of John Kerr, 7th Marquess of Lothian
Lady Caroline (died 1850), who married William Assheton Harbord, 2nd Baron Suffield
Lady Sophia (1768–1806), who married Richard Edgcumbe, 2nd Earl of Mount Edgcumbe

and three sons, who died young, and one daughter by his second wife:
Amelia Stewart, Viscountess Castlereagh (1772–1829), wife of the  Foreign Secretary Robert Stewart, Viscount Castlereagh.

He was laid to rest in the family mausoleum at Blickling Hall, the family seat in Norfolk. The bodies of his two wives are also in the mausoleum, which is an unusual grade II* listed pyramidal structure designed by architect Joseph Bonomi the Elder, based on Pyramid of Cestius in Rome.

References

Concise Dictionary of National Biography

 
 

1723 births
1793 deaths
2
Diplomatic peers
Ambassadors of Great Britain to Russia
Fellows of the Royal Society
Members of the Parliament of Great Britain for English constituencies
British MPs 1747–1754
British MPs 1754–1761
John
Lords Lieutenant of Ireland